The 1903–04 season was Manchester United's 12th season in the Football League.

Second Division

FA Cup

Squad statistics

References

Manchester United F.C. seasons
Manchester United